The Splendid Romance is a 1919 American silent drama film directed by Edward José, written by Margaret Turnbull, and starring Enrico Caruso, Ormi Hawley, Crauford Kent, and Charlotte Ives. It was released on June 1, 1919, by Paramount Pictures.
After the abysmal showing of Caruso's film debut in My Cousin, producers decided to not show The Splendid Romance in the United States. However, both films were well received in England.

Plot

Cast
Enrico Caruso as Prince Cosimo
Ormi Hawley as American Music Student
Crauford Kent 
Charlotte Ives

Preservation status
The Splendid Romance is presumed to be a lost film, although a copy may exist in a private collection.

References

External links 
 

1919 films
1910s English-language films
Silent American drama films
1919 drama films
Paramount Pictures films
Films directed by Edward José
American black-and-white films
American silent feature films
Lost American films
Enrico Caruso
1910s American films